NEPC Airlines was a private airline that operated from 1993 to 1997. It was headquartered in Chennai, then known as Madras, and was promoted by the Chennai-based NEPC group, founded by Ravi Prakash Khemka.

History
The NEPC (Natural Energy Processing Co Ltd) group acquired management control in Damania Airways  and renamed it as Skyline NEPC in May 1995. NEPC Airlines and its subsidiary, Skyline NEPC, were grounded in 1997. The International Air Transport Association (IATA)  suspended them for non-payment of dues following which they were taken off the computerised reservation system (CRS).

Fleet details

The airline operated the following aircraft:
9 - Fokker F-27 
5 - Boeing 737-200.

References

External links

NEPC India Ltd.

Defunct airlines of India
Airlines established in 1993
Airlines disestablished in 1997
Companies based in Chennai
Indian companies disestablished in 1997
Indian companies established in 1993
1993 establishments in Tamil Nadu